Sugar Tax is the eighth studio album by English electronic band Orchestral Manoeuvres in the Dark (OMD), released on 7 May 1991 by Virgin Records. It was the group's first studio album since 1986's The Pacific Age, and the first of three recorded without co-founder Paul Humphreys, who had departed in 1989. Featuring singer Andy McCluskey with a new backing band, it leans towards the dance-pop style that was becoming increasingly popular within mainstream music at the time.

Sugar Tax met with mixed reviews but became one of OMD's biggest commercial successes, selling three million copies by 2007. The record peaked at number three on the UK Albums Chart and spawned four singles, including the UK top-10 hits "Sailing on the Seven Seas" and "Pandora's Box".

Sugar Tax is the only album in the OMD catalogue not to feature the songwriting contribution of Paul Humphreys.

Background
In the aftermath of the band's 1989 split, Virgin Records gave the OMD moniker to singer Andy McCluskey, while departing members Paul Humphreys, Martin Cooper and Malcolm Holmes named their new ensemble The Listening Pool.

McCluskey dealt with anxiety about continuing as OMD, stating, "My name doesn't appear anywhere on the album. I was trying to hide behind the corporate identity of OMD because I was terrified that I was on my own because all I'd ever known was working with Paul and then Paul, Malcolm and Martin." His fears were assuaged somewhat by collaborating with new group members Nigel Ipinson and Phil Coxon. Stuart Kershaw, who would join the band as an instrumentalist in later years, co-wrote five tracks.

Recording took place at various studios in Liverpool and London. Andy Richards was enlisted as a producer but McCluskey elected to self-produce much of the record with assistance from Coxon and Jeremy Allom in engineering roles. The album is characterised by its extensive use of the Korg M1 workstation.

"Pandora's Box" was inspired by silent movie actress Louise Brooks. The song shares its title with the film Pandora's Box (1929), which stars Brooks in the lead role. "Neon Lights" is a cover of a Kraftwerk song, originally featured on The Man-Machine (1978). "Apollo XI" uses samples from Apollo space missions; a club mix was pressed on white label 12". "Walk Tall" utilises a choral sample from "Miserere" by Gregorio Allegri, and was originally titled "Coming to See You".

The record title Sugar Tax refers to the notion of everything sweet having a price, including relationships. The actual "Sugar Tax" track was not completed in time for the album's release, and was instead included as a B-side to "Then You Turn Away". The artwork was designed by Area with photography by Trevor Key, and features an oil sculpture.

Reception

Sugar Tax met with mixed reviews. Richard Riccio of the St. Petersburg Times wrote, "Sugar Tax is classic OMD, and after a four-year absence marks a triumphant return... McCluskey has managed to distill all the best qualities of a 12-year career into a highly listenable album." Q journalist Paul Davies referred to "an unflappable album of quality songs which re-establishes OMD's credentials as masters of synthesized melancholia and dreamy pop." Barbara Jaeger of The Record took issue with McCluskey's "banal [lyrics] detailing tales of lost and unrequited love", but commended his "rich emotive tenor" and allowed that "the rhythms and melodies of OMD's brand of dance-pop are as buoyant and inviting as ever". RPM selected  Sugar Tax as their "album pick" for the week of 15 June; on 12 July, CMJ reporters named it one of the 10 best recent albums.

Other writers were less enthusiastic. NMEs Andrew Collins portrayed Sugar Tax as a "deft exercise in short-range synthesiser pop that, for the most part, flutters along on a criminally simplistic vibe with all but a low-rent beatbox and a well-depressed instant choir button to perk it up." Evelyn Erskine of the Ottawa Citizen stated, "Occasionally OMD manages to find the hypnotic pulse that once made the band tick. But it never really traces it to the dark soul that once set it apart." Vox journalist Steve Malins praised the record's candour and "smooth production", but felt its content "lacks any lasting impact". James Muretich of the Calgary Herald dismissed the album as "sugary, taxing pop that goes poof in the night".

The Morning Calls Len Righi later argued that Sugar Tax had been "underappreciated", and applauded McCluskey's "superb job" on the record. Paul Evans of Rolling Stone wrote, "McCluskey plays it pretty safe—but 'Pandora's Box', 'Walk Tall' and nearly all of the album's 12 mechano-ditties make for dance-floor wonder." PopMatters critic Michael Keefe dubbed Sugar Tax the "last good OMD album" released prior to the group's 1996 disbandment. Ned Raggett of AllMusic remained unconvinced, describing the record as "a less-spectacular range of songs that only occasionally connect". He did, however, have praise for "Sailing on the Seven Seas" as well as McCluskey's "fine singing".

Sugar Tax became one of OMD's most popular albums, achieving sales of three million copies by 2007. In 2021, the Charlatans frontman Tim Burgess staged a Twitter listening party of the record, stating that he had forgotten "quite how brilliant" it is.

Track listing

Personnel 
OMD:
 Andy McCluskey – lead vocals, bass guitar
 Nigel Ipinson – keyboards 
 Phil Coxon – keyboards, engineering, demos

Other musicians:
 Stuart Boyle – guitar
 Carmen Daye, Doreen Edwards, Sue Forshaw, Ann Heston, Stuart Kershaw, Nathalie Loates, Christine Mellor (appears courtesy of Fever Urbain Records), Beverly Reppion – additional vocals

Production 
 Recorded and performed by: Orchestral Manoeuvres in the Dark for and on behalf of Blue Noise Ltd., except "Neon Lights" by OMD and Christine Mellor.
 Published by: Virgin Music (Publishers) Ltd., except "Neon Lights" by EMI Music Publishers Ltd.
 Produced by: Orchestral Manoeuvres in the Dark, except Howard Gray (4), Andy Richards (7, 9, 12)
 Mixed by: Jeremy Allom, Avril Mackintosh, Alan Meyerson, Steve Williams
 Engineered by: Jeremy Allom, Phil Coxon, Fred De Faye, Guy Forrester, Mike Haas, Renny Hill, Pat O'Shaughnessy, Steve Williams.
 Recorded at: The Pink Museum, Liverpool; The Strongroom, London; The Townhouse, London; Amazon Studios, Liverpool.
 Mixed at: The Roundhouse, London; The Townhouse, London; Larrabee Sounds, Los Angeles; Mayfair Studios, London.
 Management: Steve Jensen and Martin Kirkup for Direct Management Group, Los Angeles
 Sleeve designed by: Area
 Photography by: Trevor Key
 Portrait by: David Sheinman

Equipment

Recording:

Akai S1000 sampler + hard drive
Alesis HR16 drum machine
Atari 1040ST computer
Casio CZ 230s synth
E-mu Proteus sample reader
Korg M1 workstation
Oberheim Matrix 1000 synth module
Roland D110 synth module
Roland Super JX synth module
Steinberg Pro24 v3 sequencing software
Yamaha RX-5 drum machine
Yamaha TX81Z synth module

Live:

Akai S1000 (8MEG) sampler (x2)
Cheetah Midi controller keyboard
Korg M1R synth module (x2)
Roland A80 MIDI controller keyboard
Roland D-550
Roland piano module

Charts

Weekly charts

Year-end charts

Certifications

References

External links
 Album lyrics

1991 albums
Orchestral Manoeuvres in the Dark albums
Virgin Records albums